The , also known as Masked Rider Series (until Decade), is a Japanese superhero media franchise consisting of tokusatsu television programs, films, manga, and anime, created by manga artist Shotaro Ishinomori.

The franchise began in 1971 with the Kamen Rider television series, which followed college student Takeshi Hongo and his quest to defeat the world-conquering Shocker organization. The original series spawned television and film sequels and launched the Second Kaiju Boom (also known as the Henshin Boom) on Japanese television during the early 1970s, impacting the superhero and action-adventure genres in Japan.

Bandai owns the toy rights to Kamen Rider in Japan and other Asian regions. Bluefin Distribution, a subsidiary of Bandai Namco, distributes Kamen Rider merchandise in North America.

Series overview
The Kamen Rider franchise primarily revolving around the eponymous Kamen Rider, a superpowered vigilante who mostly resembles a grasshopper and rides a motorcycle, and their one-man war against an ever-larger malevolent force, usually a terrorist organization bent on world domination. A common running theme in the franchise is that the Rider's power derived from the same source and technology used by malevolent forces, thus forming a moral vow for the protagonists to use this power to fight against evil.

Similar to its counterpart, each series focuses on a different Rider, a new set of characters and a different story set in its own universe, though there been multiple instances of past characters from previous Kamen Rider series crossing over to team up against a common foe.

The Kamen Riders
The , also known as simply , is a collective name referring to the eponymous heroes and numerous individuals of the series. Usually resembling a grasshopper-themed masked superhero or a similarly-looking vigilante in spandex, the Riders are enhanced humans with superhuman strength, resilience and agility, specifically modified to fight an entire army. Originally created by the terrorist organization known as "Shocker" as a means of creating super-soldiers, one of these potential soldiers, biochemistry lab student and motorcycle enthusiast Takeshi Hongo, escaped from captivity and has since been fighting against Shocker, often recruiting similar individuals to fight alongside him.

A common theme amongst the Riders is that the Rider System's power was derived from the same technology/power source used by the villains, ironically using it fight against evil to such extent.

History

Showa era
He and Hirayama redesigned the main character to resemble a grasshopper. During the filming of episode 10, Fujioka was thrown from his motorcycle during a stunt and broke both legs. His character was temporarily phased out until the introduction of another transformed human, Hayato Ichimonji/Kamen Rider 2 (played by Takeshi Sasaki) was introduced in episode 14. Hongo (Fujioka) was reintroduced in episode 40, and by episode 53, had fully replaced Ichimonji's character until the two were united in episodes 72, 73, 93, 94 - and the series finale - episode 98. The series from April 1971 to January 1976 (Kamen Rider, V3, X, Amazon, Stronger) included a recurring mentor, Tobei Tachibana.

After a four-year hiatus following the finale of Kamen Rider Stronger, the series returned to broadcast television in October 1979 for two years with The New Kamen Rider (featuring Skyrider) and Kamen Rider Super-1. In these shows, Tachibana was replaced by a similar character named . The annual new shows ended briefly during the 1980s, punctuated by the 1984 Kamen Rider ZX special Birth of the 10th! Kamen Riders All Together!! (Hirayama's last project for the franchise).

Kamen Rider Black premiered in 1987, the first series not hinting at a relationship to its predecessors. Black was the first show in the franchise with a direct sequel: Kamen Rider Black RX, the basis of Saban's Americanized Masked Rider. In RX finale, the ten previous Riders returned to help Black RX defeat the Crisis Empire. Kamen Rider Black RX was the final show produced during the Shōwa era, with the franchise resuming production by the end of the 20th century. A manga of Kamen Rider Black was a novelization and reimagination of the Black-RX series' continuity. Absent from television during the 1990s, the franchise was kept alive by stage shows, musical CDs, and the Shin, ZO, and J films.

Heisei era

Phase 1
Toei announced a new project, Kamen Rider Kuuga, in May 1999. Kuuga was part of Ishinomori's 1997 Kamen Rider revival in preparation for its 30th anniversary, but he died before the shows materialized. During the summer of 1999, Kuuga was promoted in magazine advertisements and TV commercials. On January 30, 2000, Kamen Rider Kuuga premiered with newcomer Joe Odagiri. Following Kuuga 2001 sequel Kamen Rider Agito, the series deviated into a series of unconnected stories starting from Kamen Rider Ryuki in 2002 to Kamen Rider Kabuto in 2006.

In 2005, Kamen Rider: The First was produced. Written by Toshiki Inoue, the film reimagines the manga and original television series and characters from the original series had their storylines altered to fit the film's time span. Masaya Kikawada played Takeshi Hongo/Kamen Rider 1 and Hassei Takano (previously Miyuki Tezuka/Kamen Rider Raia in Kamen Rider Ryuki) was Hayato Ichimonji/Kamen Rider 2. This was followed in 2007 by Kamen Rider The Next, an adaptation of Kamen Rider V3 starring Kazuki Kato (previously Daisuke Kazama/Kamen Rider Drake in Kamen Rider Kabuto) as Shiro Kazami/Kamen Rider V3 and with Kikawada and Takano reprising their roles.

The eighth series, Kamen Rider Den-O, followed in 2007. It differed from past Kamen Rider series with the main protagonist being unsure of himself and uses a large vehicle, the DenLiner: a time traveling bullet train. Although the series has only two riders (Den-O and Zeronos), they have multiple forms similar to Black RX, Kuuga, and Agito. Due to Den-O popularity, a second film crossover with the 2008 series Kamen Rider Kiva was released on April 12, 2008. The top film in its opening weekend, it grossed ¥730 million. In addition, Animate produced an OVA, Imagin Anime, with SD versions of the Imagin. A third film, Saraba Kamen Rider Den-O: Final Countdown (with two new riders) serves as a series epilogue. According to Takeru Satoh, who played the titular protagonist in the television series and first three films, Den-O was successful because of its humor.

The 2009 series, Kamen Rider Decade, commemorated the Heisei run's 10th anniversary with its protagonist able to assume the forms of his predecessors. Japanese recording artist Gackt performed the series' opening theme, "Journey through the Decade", and the film's theme song ("The Next Decade") and jokingly expressed interest in playing a villain on the show. Also announced in 2009 was a fourth Den-O film (later revealed as the beginning of the Cho-Den-O Series of films), starting with Cho Kamen Rider Den-O & Decade Neo Generations: The Onigashima Warship. In the March 2009 issue of Kindai magazine, Decade star Masahiro Inoue said that the series was scheduled for only 30 episodes.

Phase 2
Advertisements in May, June, and July 2009 promoted the debut of Kamen Rider W, who first appeared at the 10th-anniversary Masked Rider Live event and was featured in Kamen Rider Decade: All Riders vs. Dai-Shocker. The staff of W said that they planned to make 10 more years of Kamen Rider, differentiating subsequent series from the Kuuga through Decade period (including a new broadcast season from September of one year to about August of the next). The hero of Kamen Rider W is the first Kamen Rider to transform from two people at once, and the series premiered on September 6, 2009. Continuing into 2010 with Kamen Rider × Kamen Rider W & Decade: Movie War 2010, W ran from September 2009 to September 2010 instead of from January to January. The second, third, and fourth films of the Cho-Den-O series, collectively known as Kamen Rider × Kamen Rider × Kamen Rider The Movie: Cho-Den-O Trilogy, were also released in 2010. Late 2010 brought the series Kamen Rider OOO to television after Ws finale, and 2011 observed the 40th anniversary of the franchise. Festivities that year included the Kamen Rider Girls idol group, the film OOO, Den-O, All Riders: Let's Go Kamen Riders (released on April 1) and OOOs successor, Kamen Rider Fourze, which references the previous heroes in its characters' names and its plot. A crossover film, Kamen Rider × Super Sentai: Super Hero Taisen, was released in 2012 featuring the heroes of all Kamen Rider and Super Sentai series to date.

With Fourzes run complete in 2012, Kamen Rider Wizard premiered; its protagonist was the first Kamen Rider to use magic. Wizard additionally had the first homosexual character and cast member with Kaba-chan. Kamen Rider × Super Sentai × Space Sheriff: Super Hero Taisen Z, a sequel to 2012's Super Hero Taisen with the revived Metal Hero Series characters from Space Sheriff Gavan: The Movie and other characters created by Shotaro Ishinomori appearing in Kamen Rider × Kamen Rider Wizard & Fourze: Movie War Ultimatum, was released in 2013.

On May 20, 2013, Toei filed for several trademarks on the phrase . Kamen Rider Gaim previewed on July 25, 2013, revealing a Sengoku period and fruit-themed motif to the series' multiple-rival Kamen Riders and Gen Urobuchi as the series' main writer. The third entry in the Super Hero Taisen film series, Heisei Rider vs. Shōwa Rider: Kamen Rider Taisen feat. Super Sentai, marked the 15th anniversary of the Heisei Kamen Rider era and revolved around a conflict between the 15 Heisei Riders and the 15 Showa Riders with Kamen Rider Fifteen, and a cameo appearance by the ToQgers and the Kyoryugers. It also marked the start of a yearly  involving each year's Kamen Rider teaming up with the current Super Sentai team in a story tying into that year's entry in the Super Hero Taisen movie series. Gaim was followed in 2014 by Kamen Rider Drive, the first Kamen Rider since Kamen Rider Black RX (who also used a motorcycle), to use a car instead of a motorcycle. The fourth Super Hero Taisen, Super Hero Taisen GP, marks Kamen Rider 3 first live-action appearance after the Showa Kamen Rider manga. Kamen Rider Ghost was introduced in 2015. In 2016 the Kamen Rider series celebrated its 45th anniversary, and Toei released the film Kamen Rider 1 on March 26, 2016. Kamen Rider Ex-Aid was introduced in 2016 and was the first Rider series to have a character, Kiriya Kujo, portray the main Rider's motorcycle. A Movie War film known as Kamen Rider Heisei Generations: Dr. Pac-Man vs. Ex-Aid & Ghost with Legend Rider was announced for December 10, 2016, featuring Bandai Namco Entertainment's original character created by Namco prior to merging with Bandai in 2006, Pac-Man. Following up Ex-Aid's finale, Kamen Rider Build premiered on September 3, 2017. The twentieth and last series of the Heisei era, Kamen Rider Zi-O, which commemorates the 20th anniversary of the Heisei era, premiered on September 2, 2018. On December 22, 2018, a film commemorating all the Riders of the Heisei Era titled Kamen Rider Heisei Generations Forever premiered in Japanese theaters.

Reiwa era
On May 13, 2019, Toei filed a trademark on the phrase , which premiered on September 1, 2019.
. It is planned for release in 2023.

The franchise's current entry in the Reiwa era is Kamen Rider Geats, which debuted in September 2022 following the finale of Revice.

Production

Main series

The following is a list of the Kamen Rider series and their broadcast years:

Television specials

Theatrical releases
 1971: Go Go Kamen Rider (Movie version of episode 13)
 1972: Kamen Rider vs. Shocker
 1972: Kamen Rider vs. Ambassador Hell
 1973: Kamen Rider V3 (Movie version of episode 2)
 1973: Kamen Rider V3 vs. the Destron Monsters
 1974: Kamen Rider X (Movie version of episode 3)
 1974: Kamen Rider X: Five Riders vs. King Dark
 1975: Kamen Rider Amazon (Movie version of episode 16)
 1975: Kamen Rider Stronger (Movie version of episode 7)
 1980: Kamen Rider: Eight Riders vs. Galaxy King
 1981: Kamen Rider Super-1
 1988: Kamen Rider Black: Hurry to Onigashima
 1988: Kamen Rider Black: Fear! Evil Monster Mansion
 1989: Kamen Rider: Stay in the World – 3D theme park special
 1992: Shin Kamen Rider: Prologue
 1993: Kamen Rider ZO 
 1994: Kamen Rider J 
 1994: Kamen Rider World – 3-D theme park special
 2001: Kamen Rider Agito: Project G4
 2002: Kamen Rider Ryuki: Episode Final
 2003: Kamen Rider 555: Paradise Lost
 2004: Kamen Rider Blade: Missing Ace
 2005: Kamen Rider Hibiki & The Seven Senki
 2005: Kamen Rider: The First
 2006: Kamen Rider Kabuto: God Speed Love
 2007: Kamen Rider Den-O: I'm Born!
 2007: Kamen Rider: The Next
 2008: Kamen Rider Den-O & Kiva: Climax Deka
 2008: Kamen Rider Kiva: King of the Castle in the Demon World
 2008: Saraba Kamen Rider Den-O: Final Countdown
 2009: Cho Kamen Rider Den-O & Decade Neo Generations: The Onigashima Warship
 2009: Kamen Rider Decade: All Riders vs. Dai-Shocker
 2009: Kamen Rider × Kamen Rider W & Decade: Movie War 2010
 Kamen Rider Decade: The Last Story
 Kamen Rider W: Begins Night
 Movie War 2010
 2010: Kamen Rider × Kamen Rider × Kamen Rider The Movie: Cho-Den-O Trilogy
 Episode Red: Zero no Star Twinkle
 Episode Blue: The Dispatched Imagin is Newtral
 Episode Yellow: Treasure de End Pirates
 2010: Kamen Rider W Forever: A to Z/The Gaia Memories of Fate
 2010: Kamen Rider × Kamen Rider OOO & W Featuring Skull: Movie War Core
 Kamen Rider Skull: Message for Double
 Kamen Rider OOO: Nobunaga's Desire
 Movie War Core
 2011: OOO, Den-O, All Riders: Let's Go Kamen Riders
 2011: Kamen Rider OOO Wonderful: The Shogun and the 21 Core Medals
 2011: Kamen Rider × Kamen Rider Fourze & OOO: Movie War Mega Max
 Beginning: Fight! Legendary Seven Riders
 Kamen Rider OOO: Ankh's Resurrection, the Medals of the Future, and the Leading Hope
 Futo, The Conspiracy Advances: Gallant! Kamen Rider Joker
 Kamen Rider Fourze: Nade-Shiko Ad-Vent
 Movie War Mega Max: Gather! Warriors of Glory
 2012: Kamen Rider × Super Sentai: Super Hero Taisen
 2012: Kamen Rider Fourze the Movie: Space, Here We Come!
 2012: Kamen Rider × Kamen Rider Wizard & Fourze: Movie War Ultimatum
 Kamen Rider Fourze
 Kamen Rider Wizard
 Movie War Ultimatum
 2013: Kamen Rider × Super Sentai × Space Sheriff: Super Hero Taisen Z
 2013: Kamen Rider Wizard in Magic Land
 2013: Kamen Rider × Kamen Rider Gaim & Wizard: The Fateful Sengoku Movie Battle
 Kamen Rider Wizard: The Promised Place
 Kamen Rider Gaim: Sengoku Battle Royale
 2014: Kamen Rider × Super Sentai × Space Sheriff: Super Hero Taisen Z
 2014: Heisei Riders vs. Shōwa Riders: Kamen Rider Taisen feat. Super Sentai
 2014: Kamen Rider Gaim: Great Soccer Battle! Golden Fruits Cup!
 2014: Kamen Rider × Kamen Rider Drive & Gaim: Movie War Full Throttle
 Kamen Rider Gaim: The Advancing Last Stage
 Kamen Rider Drive: A Challenge from Lupin
 Movie War Full Throttle
 2015: Super Hero Taisen GP: Kamen Rider 3
 2015: Kamen Rider Drive: Surprise Future
 2015: Kamen Rider × Kamen Rider Ghost & Drive: Super Movie War Genesis
 2016: Kamen Rider 1
 2016: Kamen Rider Ghost: The 100 Eyecons and Ghost's Fated Moment
 2016: Kamen Rider Heisei Generations: Dr. Pac-Man vs. Ex-Aid & Ghost with Legend Riders
 2017: Kamen Rider × Super Sentai: Ultra Super Hero Taisen
 2017: Kamen Rider Ex-Aid the Movie: True Ending
 2017: Kamen Rider Heisei Generations Final: Build & Ex-Aid with Legend Rider
 2018: Kamen Rider Amazons the Movie: The Last Judgement
 2018: Kamen Rider Build the Movie: Be the One
 2018: Kamen Rider Heisei Generations Forever
 2019: Kamen Rider Zi-O the Movie: Over Quartzer
 2019: Kamen Rider Reiwa The First Generation
 2020: Kamen Rider Zero-One the Movie: Real×Time
 2020: Kamen Rider Saber Theatrical Short Story: The Phoenix Swordsman and the Book of Ruin
 2021: Saber + Zenkaiger: Super Hero Senki
 2021: Kamen Rider Revice (short film)
 2021: Kamen Rider Beyond Generations
 2022: Kamen Rider Revice Battle Familia
 2022: Kamen Rider Geats × Revice: Movie Battle Royale
 2023: Shin Kamen Rider

V-Cinema releases
Direct-to-video releases, films focusing on secondary riders and storylines, began appearing during the franchise's Heisei era. Hyper Battle Videos are episodes included with Televi-Kun magazine.

 1992: Shin Kamen Rider: Prologue
 1993: Kamen Rider SD – Only anime adaptation
 2011: Kamen Rider W Returns
 Kamen Rider Accel Chapter
 Kamen Rider Eternal Chapter
 2015: Kamen Rider Gaim Gaiden
 First Part
 Kamen Rider Zangetsu Chapter
 Kamen Rider Baron Chapter
 Second Part
 Kamen Rider Duke Chapter
 Kamen Rider Knuckle Chapter
 Third Part
 Kamen Rider Zangetsu Chapter (Stage Show 2019)
 Kamen Rider Gridon VS Kamen Rider Bravo Chapter (2 Special 2020)
 2016: Kamen Rider Drive Saga
 First Part
 Kamen Rider Chaser Chapter
 Second Part
 Kamen Rider Heart Chapter
 Kamen Rider Mach Chapter
 Third Part
 Kamen Rider Brain Chapter (2 Special 2019)
 2017: Kamen Rider Ghost Re-Birth: Kamen Rider Specter
 2018: Kamen Rider Ex-Aid Trilogy: Another Ending
 Brave & Snipe Chapter
 Para-DX with Poppy Chapter
 Genm vs. Lazer Chapter
 2019: Kamen Rider Build New World
 First Part
 Kamen Rider Cross-Z Chapter
 Second Part
 Kamen Rider Grease Chapter
 2020: Kamen Rider Zi-O Next Time
 Kamen Rider Geiz Majesty Chapter
 2021: Kamen Rider Zero-One Others
 Kamen Rider Metsuboujinrai Chapter
 Kamen Rider Vulcan & Valkyrie Chapter
 2022: Kamen Rider Saber: Trio of Deep Sin
 2022: Kamen Rider OOO 10th: Core Medal of Resurrection

Hyper Battle videos
 2000: Kamen Rider Kuuga: vs. the Strong Monster Go-Jiino-Da
 2001: Kamen Rider Agito: Three rider TV-kun Special
 2002: Kamen Rider Ryuki Hyper Battle: Kamen Rider Ryuki vs. Kamen Rider Agito
 2003: Kamen Rider 555: The Musical
 2004: Kamen Rider Blade: Blade vs Blade
 2005: Kamen Rider Hibiki: Transform Asumu: You can be an Oni too
 2006: Kamen Rider Kabuto: Birth! Gatack Hyper Form!
 2007: Kamen Rider Den-O: Singing, Dancing, Great Time!!
 2008: Kamen Rider Kiva: You Can Also be Kiva
 2009: Kamen Rider Decade: Protect! The World of TV-Kun
 2010: Kamen Rider W: Donburi's α/Farewell Recipe of Love
 2011: Kamen Rider OOO: Quiz, Dance, and Takagarooba!?
 2012: Kamen Rider Fourze: Rocket Drill States of Friendship
 2013: Kamen Rider Wizard: Showtime with the Dance Ring
 2014: Kamen Rider Gaim: Fresh Orange Arms is Born! 
 2015: Kamen Rider Drive Hyper Battle:
 Type TV-KUN: Hunter & Monster! Chase the Mystery of the Super Thief!
 Type High Speed! The True Power! Type High Speed is Born!
 2016: Kamen Rider Ghost Hyper Battle:
 Ikkyu Eyecon Contention! Quick Wit Battle!!
 Ikkyu Eyecon! Awaken, My Quick Wit Power!!
 Truth! The Secret Of Heroes' Eyecons!
2017: Kamen Rider Ex-Aid "Tricks"
Kamen Rider Lazer
Kamen Rider Para-DX
2018: Kamen Rider Build
 Birth! KumaTelevi!! VS Kamen Rider Grease!
 Kamen Rider Prime Rogue
2019: Kamen Rider ZI-O: Kamen Rider Bi Bi Bi no Bibill Geiz
2019: Kamen Rider Zero-One: What Will Pop Out of the Kangaroo? Think About It by Yourself! Yes! It must be me, Aruto! 
2021: Kamen Rider Saber: Gather! Hero! The Explosive Dragon TVKun
2022: Kamen Rider Revice: Koala VS Kangaroo!! Do you want to avoid love at the wedding?!

Web exclusive
 2015: D-Video Special: Kamen Rider 4
 2016: Kamen Rider Ghost: Legendary! Riders' Souls!
 2016–2017: Kamen Rider Amazons
 2017: Kamen Sentai Gorider
 2018: Kamen Rider Build: Raising the Hazard Level ~7 Best Matches~
 2019: Kamen Rider Zi-O Spin-off
 Rider Time: Kamen Rider Shinobi
 Rider Time: Kamen Rider Ryuki
 Rider Time: Kamen Rider Zi-O VS Decade -7 of Zi-O!-
 Rider Time: Kamen Rider Decade VS Zi-O -Decade Mansion's Death Game-
 2021: Kamen Rider Saber Spin Off: Swordsmen Chronicles
 2021: Kamen Rider Genms -The Presidents-
 2021: Kamen Rider Saber × Ghost
 2021: Kamen Rider Specter × Blades
 2022: Kamen Rider Revice: The Mystery
 2022: Kamen Rider Genms -Smart Brain and the 1000% Crisis-
 2022: Revice Legacy
 Revice Legacy: Kamen Rider Vail
 Part 2
 Part 3
 2022: Kamen Rider Black Sun

Others
 2016: The Legend of Hero Alain
 2017: Kamen Rider Snipe: Episode ZERO
 2018: ROGUE
 2020: Project Thouser
 2021: Kamen Rider Saber Spin-Off: Sword of Logos Saga
 2022: DEAR GAGA

Adaptations outside Japan

Taiwan
In 1975–1976, Tong Hsing Film Co., Ltd. in Taiwan produced a Super Riders series based on the Japanese version.
 1975: The Super Rider V3 based on Kamen Rider V3
 1976: The Five Of Super Rider based on Kamen Rider X
 1976: The Super Riders based on Kamen Rider vs. Shocker and Kamen Rider vs. Hell AmbassadorUnited States
In 1995, Saban produced the first American Masked Rider series after its success adapting Super Sentai into Power Rangers and the Metal Hero Series (VR Troopers and Beetleborgs). Unfortunately, the show was panned by critics and fans from the series, and it only lasted one 40-episode season, with the first 27 debuting on Fox Kids, while the other 13 debuted in syndication.

In 2009, a new series, produced by Michael and Steve Wang, was broadcast: Kamen Rider: Dragon Knight, which was adapted from Kamen Rider Ryuki. Although it was canceled before finishing its syndicated run, it won the first Daytime Emmy for Outstanding Stunt Coordination at the 37th Daytime Emmy Awards.

Unofficial Thailand adaptation
In 1975, Chaiyo Productions made an unofficial Kamen Rider movie entitled Hanuman and the Five Riders, which used original footage of Chaiyo's Hanuman character, spliced with footage from the "Five Riders Vs. King Dark" movie. However, Chaiyo went ahead with the production without authorisation after Toei denied them permission to make an official movie with them, putting the legality of the movie into question.

Merchandise
, Bandai Namco has sold  Kamen Rider transformation belts since February 2000.

Homages and parodies

The Kamen Rider franchise has been parodied in and outside Japan. One parody is of the Kamen Rider henshin (metamorphosis) pose. In video games, Skullomania (from Street Fighter EX) and May Lee (from The King of Fighters) are examples of Kamen Rider parodies. In anime, examples include Fair, then Partly Piggy, My-HiME (and its sequel, My Otome), Dragon Ball Z, and Franken Fran. In the Crayon Shin-chan series, the title character interacts with Kamen Riders in crossover specials. Detective Conan has a recurring TV series the detective boys like to watch, Kamen Yaiba. In One Punch Man, the C Class Hero Mumen Rider is a parody, being an ordinary man in a world of superhuman beings, riding a bicycle rather than a motorcycle. However, despite his weakness, he is extremely heroic and his actions form a counterpoint to his parodic character conception. The series has also been parodied and homaged in the Disney Channel series Amphibia.

In live-action, parodies include "Kamen Renaider" by SMAP's Takuya Kimura and Shingo Katori, a parody of Ryuki; "Kamen Zaiber", a parody of the original series; "Kamen Norider" by the Tunnels, a parody of Kamen Rider 1 and as well as the first series; "Kamen Rider HG", Hard Gay's parody of the original for a Japanese TV show, and "Ridermen" (a short skit with a man called Ridermen, a parody of the Riderman on the set of Kamen Rider Kuuga.

Akimasa Nakamura, a Japanese astronomer named two minor planets in honor of the series: 12408 Fujioka for actor Hiroshi Fujioka, known for his portrayal of Takeshi Hongo/Kamen Rider 1, and 12796 Kamenrider for the series itself.

References

External links

TV Asahi
 Kamen Rider Geats
 Kamen Rider Revice
 Kamen Rider Saber
 Kamen Rider Zero-One
 Kamen Rider Zi-O
 Kamen Rider Build
 Kamen Rider Ex-Aid
 Kamen Rider Ghost
 Kamen Rider Drive
 Kamen Rider Gaim
 Kamen Rider Wizard
 Kamen Rider Fourze
 Kamen Rider OOO
 Kamen Rider W
 Kamen Rider Decade
 Kamen Rider Kiva
 Kamen Rider Den-O
 Kamen Rider Kabuto
 Kamen Rider Hibiki
 Kamen Rider Blade
 Kamen Rider 555
 Kamen Rider Ryuki

Toei
 Kamen Rider Zi-O
 Kamen Rider Build
 Kamen Rider Amazons Season 2
 Kamen Rider Ex-Aid
 Kamen Rider Amazons
 Kamen Rider Ghost
 Kamen Rider Drive
 Kamen Rider Gaim
 Kamen Rider Wizard
 Kamen Rider Fourze
 Kamen Rider OOO
 Kamen Rider W
 Kamen Rider Decade
 Kamen Rider Kiva
 Kamen Rider The Next
 Kamen Rider Den-O
 Kamen Rider Kabuto
 Kamen Rider The First
 Kamen Rider Hibiki
 Kamen Rider Blade
 Kamen Rider 555
 Kamen Rider Ryuki
 Kamen Rider Agito
 Kamen Rider Kuuga

Bandai
 Kamen Rider Ghost
 Kamen Rider Drive
 Kamen Rider Gaim
 Kamen Rider Wizard
 Kamen Rider Fourze
 Kamen Rider OOO
 Kamen Rider W
 Kamen Rider Decade

Others
 Kamen Rider Official – The main site of the Kamen Rider franchise ,the background changes when next series premieres. 
 Ishimori@Style – Shotaro Ishinomori with Ishimori Productions Official Website
 Toei Kyoto Studio Park – A theme park with official events, exhibitions and shops related to the Kamen Rider series
 Bandai Korea's Kamen Rider site – The site's look changes when the next series premieres in Korea

 
Bandai brands
Bandai Namco franchises
Manga series
Mass media franchises introduced in 1971
Japanese drama television series
Teen superhero television series
Toei tokusatsu